Danielle Simone Bradbery (born July 23, 1996) is an American country pop singer. She won season 4 of NBC's The Voice in 2013, becoming the youngest artist to win the competition at age 16.  Since then, she has released three albums and multiple singles.

Bradbery's debut studio album, Danielle Bradbery, was released on November 25, 2013. Her second album, I Don't Believe We've Met, was released on December 1, 2017. Most recently, Bradbery has released "Break My Heart Again" and "Never Have I Ever - Yo Nunca He . . ." with KURT, her first bilingual single.

Early life
Bradbery was born on July 23, 1996, in Houston, Texas to parents Danny Bradbery and Gloria Redden Martinez but moved to Cypress. She attended Cypress Ranch High School.

Career

The Voice (2013)

During the blind auditions of The Voice on March 25, 2013, Bradbery performed Taylor Swift's "Mean", prompting Adam Levine, Blake Shelton, and Usher to turn their chairs. Bradbery then chose Shelton and remained on his team. At the Battle rounds, Bradbery faced Caroline Glaser where they sang the song "Put Your Records On", Bradbery was chosen over Glaser, in the process advanced to the Knockout rounds. During the Knockouts, Bradbery sang "Jesus Take The Wheel" against Taylor Beckham in which Blake selected her to remain in the competition, sending home Beckham. During the Top 16 show, she sang "Maybe It Was Memphis" and was voted through by America into the next week. The following week, the country singer sang a rendition of Carrie Underwood's song "Wasted." During the Top 10 playoffs, Bradbery sang a rendition of "Heads Carolina, Tails California", which became the first song of the season, and only song of that round, to reach the iTunes top 10 charts.

During the Top 8, Bradbery sang a rendition of "Grandpa (Tell Me 'Bout the Good Ol' Days)." In the Top 6, she sang Pam Tillis' "Shake the Sugar Tree" chosen by coach Blake Shelton. That week, she also sang Sara Evans' "A Little Bit Stronger," ending the song with a high note through the final "stronger" and "yeah" run. During the Top 5, Bradbery sang "Please Remember Me" and "Who I Am" which reached 6 and 4 spots respectively on the iTunes top 10 charts. During "Who I Am," she walked out through the audience to sing beside her parents and stepmother. At the finals, Bradbery sang the song "Timber, I'm Falling in Love" along with her coach Blake Shelton, she also re-sang the song "Maybe It Was Memphis" which reached the iTunes top 10 charts and sang the song "Born to Fly" before she was announced as the winner of season four of The Voice. She had the most peak positions and most singles to reach the top 10 on iTunes during the season. Overall, she had more iTunes downloads than any other contestant in the show's history. At age 16, Bradbery was the youngest winner of The Voice at the time. This record was later eclipsed by Sawyer Fredericks (who won Season Eight at age 16), and later by Brynn Cartelli (who won season 14 at age 15).

 – Studio version of performance reached the top 10 on iTunes

2013–14: Danielle Bradbery
On June 19, 2013, the day after Bradbery won The Voice, she was signed to a record deal with Big Machine Records. Her debut single, "The Heart of Dixie," was released on July 16, 2013. Bradbery's first studio album, self-titled Danielle Bradbery, was released November 25, 2013. On September 14, 2013, Bradbery performed on the WGTY Great Country Radio stage at the York Fair and sang four songs from her upcoming album, which were "Young in America", "Dance Hall", "Never Like This" and "Daughter of a Working Man". Bradbery made her Grand Ole Opry debut on the historic stage of the Ryman Auditorium in Nashville on November 12. Along with her Opry debut, Bradbery was the supporting act on Brad Paisley‘s Beat This Summer Tour. On November 17, 2013, Bradbery sang the national anthem at the opening ceremonies of the 2013 Formula 1 United States Grand Prix. Her song "My Day" was featured in the Sochi 2014 Winter Olympics as she was chosen to be "the voice" of the Games' promotional campaign that partners NBC Olympics with The Voice.

Bradbery joined Hunter Hayes as a special guest on his We're Not Invisible Tour starting March 20, 2014.

2015–2019: Singles and I Don't Believe We've Met
In a recent interview with Naked Mag, Bradbery confirmed she is writing songs for her second album and was hoping to release it sometime in 2015.
She took it to her Twitter account on August 23, 2015 that she would be releasing the first single from her second studio album "Friend Zone" on August 28, 2015. The song never had an official terrestrial radio release and was a "buzz" single.

In 2017, Bradbery finally released a song called "Sway" as a single. It debuted at No. 46 on the Billboard country chart the week on June 14 and it officially impacted country radio on August 28, 2017. She also shifted to Big Machine's BMLG imprint to accompany the release. On August 4, 2017, Bradbery announced that "Sway" would be the lead single off her upcoming second album, I Don't Believe We've Met, which was released on December 1, 2017. "Worth It" was the second single.  Finally, "Goodbye Summer" was re-recorded as a music video with Thomas Rhett, with whom she released the single "Playing with Fire."  She, Thomas Rhett, and Nick Jonas sang "Closer" at the CMA awards.  

In 2018, she focused on recording covers for her fans, including "Psycho," "Slow Burn," and "God is a Woman," as well as "Set Fire to the Rain" and others.  She also recorded "Make You Mine" with PUBLIC.

In 2019, she appeared on the Charlie's Angels: Original Motion Picture Soundtrack, contributing the song "Blackout". On May 8, she released the song "Never Have I Ever", based on her partner.  She released a music video with Parker McCollum, a cover of "Shallow," and recorded "Hometown" with Zac Brown.

Artistry
Bradbery cites Carrie Underwood, Taylor Swift, Miranda Lambert, and Martina McBride as her musical influences.

Philanthropy
On October 12, 2013, Bradbery performed "Somewhere Over the Rainbow" at the Eighth Annual Tradition of Hope Gala to support MDA's Augie's Quest which has the sole purpose of finding a cure for ALS. She also performed at the Girls & Guitars charity concert to benefit the Ryan Seacrest Foundation. Bradbery and many other country stars signed a Honey Nut Cheerios box to be auctioned off for charity Outnumber Hunger. The charity's purpose is stop hunger in the U.S.

Concert tours
Supporting
2013: Beat This Summer Tour – Brad Paisley
2014: We're Not Invisible Tour – Hunter Hayes
2014: See You Tonight Tour – Scotty McCreery
2015: Platinum Tour – Miranda Lambert
2015: Suits & Boots Tour – Brett Eldredge & Thomas Rhett
2018: Life Changes Tour – Thomas Rhett
2019: Live Forever Tour – Kane Brown

Discography

Studio albums

Singles

Promotional singles

Music videos

Releases from The Voice

Albums

Singles

Other appearances

Awards and nominations

Television appearances

Notes

References

External links
 
 Danielle Bradbery at The Voice

 
 

1996 births
American country singer-songwriters
American women country singers
Country musicians from Texas
Country pop musicians
Living people
People from League City, Texas
Singer-songwriters from Texas
The Voice (franchise) winners
People from Cypress, Texas
21st-century American women singers
21st-century American singers
Big Machine Records artists
Republic Records artists